= Changing Lives F.C. =

English football club

Changing Lives Football Club is a football club based in London, England.

== History ==
Changing Lives FC was founded in 2018.
